Depleted uranium (DU; also referred to in the past as Q-metal, depletalloy or D-38) is uranium with a lower content of the fissile isotope  than natural uranium. The less radioactive and non-fissile  constitutes the main component of depleted uranium.

Civilian uses include counterweights in aircraft, radiation shielding in medical radiation therapy and industrial radiography equipment, and containers for transporting radioactive materials. Military uses include armor plating and armor-piercing projectiles.

Most depleted uranium arises as a by-product of the production of enriched uranium for use as fuel in nuclear reactors and in the manufacture of nuclear weapons. Since  has a much longer half-life than the lighter isotopes, DU emits less alpha radiation than natural uranium. The only known natural source of uranium with a  content significantly different from 0.72% is found in the natural nuclear fission reactor at Oklo, Gabon. It can be "fingerprinted" as different in origin from manmade depleted uranium by the  content, which is 55 ppm in uranium from the Oklo Mine as well as all other natural sources, but will be lower in depleted uranium in accordance with the degree of depletion.

DU is about 60% as radioactive as natural uranium.

The use of DU in munitions is controversial because of concerns about potential long-term health effects. Normal functioning of the kidney, brain, liver, heart, and numerous other systems can be affected by exposure to uranium, a toxic metal. The biological half-life (the average time it takes for the human body to eliminate half the amount in the body) for uranium is about 15 days.
The aerosol or spallation frangible powder produced by impact and combustion of depleted uranium munitions can potentially contaminate wide areas around the impact sites, leading to possible inhalation by human beings.

The actual level of acute and chronic toxicity of DU is also controversial. Several studies using cultured cells and laboratory rodents suggest the possibility of leukemogenic, genetic, reproductive, and neurological effects from chronic exposure. According to an article in Al Jazeera, DU from American artillery is suspected to be one of the major causes of an increase in the general mortality rate in Iraq since 1991. A 2005 epidemiology review concluded: "In aggregate the human epidemiological evidence is consistent with increased risk of birth defects in offspring of persons exposed to DU." A 2021 study concluded that DU from exploding munitions did not lead to Gulf War illness in American veterans deployed in the Gulf War. According to 2013 study, despite the use of DU by coalition forces in Fallujah, no DU has been found in soil samples taken from the city,; although another study of 2011 had indicated elevated levels of uranium in tissues of the city inhabitants.

History
Enriched uranium was first manufactured in the early 1940s when the United States and Britain began their nuclear weapons programs. Later in the decade, France and the Soviet Union began their nuclear weapons and nuclear power programs. Depleted uranium was originally stored as an unusable waste product (uranium hexafluoride) in the hope that improved enrichment processes could extract additional quantities of the fissionable U-235 isotope. This re-enrichment recovery of the residual uranium-235 is now in practice in some parts of the world; e.g. in 1996 over 6000 metric tonnes were upgraded in a Russian plant.

It is possible to design civilian power-generating reactors using unenriched fuel, but only about 10% of those ever built (such as the CANDU reactor) use that technology. Thus most civilian reactors as well as all naval reactors and nuclear weapons production require fuel containing concentrated U-235 and generate depleted uranium.

In the 1970s, the Pentagon reported that the Soviet military had developed armor plating for Warsaw Pact tanks that NATO ammunition could not penetrate. The Pentagon began searching for material to make denser armor-piercing projectiles. After testing various metals, ordnance researchers settled on depleted uranium.

The US and NATO militaries used DU penetrator rounds in the 1991 Gulf War, the Bosnia war, bombing of Serbia, the 2003 invasion of Iraq, and 2015 airstrikes on ISIS in Syria. It is estimated that between 315 and 350 tons of DU were used in the 1991 Gulf War.

Production and availability
The production of enriched uranium using isotope separation creates depleted uranium containing only 0.2% to 0.4% .

Depleted uranium is further produced by recycling spent nuclear fuel, in which case it contains traces of neptunium and plutonium. Quantities are so small that they are considered to be not of serious radiological significance (even) by ECRR.

Uranium hexafluoride

Most depleted uranium is stored as uranium hexafluoride, a toxic crystalline solid, (D), in steel cylinders in open air storage yards close to enrichment plants. In the U.S.  of depleted  had accumulated by 1993. In 2008,  in 57,122 storage cylinders were located near Portsmouth, Ohio; Oak Ridge, Tennessee; and Paducah, Kentucky.

The storage of (D) presents environmental, health, and safety risks because of its chemical instability. The uranyl fluoride solid acts to plug the leak, limiting further escape of depleted . Release of the hydrogen fluoride gas to the atmosphere is also slowed by the plug formation.

Like any other uranium compound, it is radioactive, and precautions should be taken. It is also highly toxic. Uranyl fluoride is corrosive and harmful upon inhalation, ingestion, or skin absorption. Ingestion or inhalation may be fatal. Effects of exposure may be delayed.

One person died; while a few workers with higher exposure experienced short-term kidney damage (e.g., protein in the urine), none of them showed lasting damage from the exposure to uranium. The U.S. government has been converting depleted  to solid uranium oxides for use or disposal. Such disposal of the entire D inventory could cost anywhere from  million to  million.

Military applications

Depleted uranium is very dense; at 19,050 kg/m3, it is 1.67 times as dense as lead, only slightly less dense than tungsten and gold, and 84% as dense as osmium or iridium, which are the densest known substances under standard (i.e., Earth-surface) pressures. Consequently, a DU projectile of given mass has a smaller diameter than an equivalent lead projectile, with less aerodynamic drag and deeper penetration because of a higher pressure at point of impact. DU projectiles are inherently incendiary because they become pyrophoric upon impact with the target.

Armor plate
Because of its high density, depleted uranium can also be used in tank armor, sandwiched between sheets of steel armor plate. For instance, some late-production M1A1 and M1A2 Abrams tanks built after 1998 have DU modules integrated into their Chobham armor, as part of the armor plating in the front of the hull and the front of the turret, and there is a program to upgrade the rest.

Nuclear weapons

Depleted uranium can be used as a tamper, or neutron reflector, in fission bombs. A high density tamper like DU makes for a longer-lasting, more energetic, and more efficient explosion.

Ammunition
Most military use of depleted uranium has been as 30 mm ordnance, primarily the 30 mm PGU-14/B armour-piercing incendiary round from the GAU-8 Avenger cannon of the A-10 Thunderbolt II used by the United States Air Force. 25 mm DU rounds have been used in the M242 gun mounted on the U.S. Army's Bradley Fighting Vehicle and the Marine Corps's LAV-25.

The U.S. Marine Corps uses DU in the 25 mm PGU-20 round fired by the GAU-12 Equalizer cannon of the AV-8B Harrier, and also in the 20 mm M197 gun mounted on AH-1 Cobra helicopter gunships. The United States Navy's Phalanx CIWS's M61 Vulcan Gatling gun used 20 mm armor-piercing penetrator rounds with discarding plastic sabots and a core made using depleted uranium, later changed to tungsten.

Another use of depleted uranium is in kinetic energy penetrators, anti-armor rounds such as the 120 mm sabot rounds fired from the British Challenger 1, Challenger 2, M1A1 and M1A2 Abrams. Kinetic energy penetrator rounds consist of a long, relatively thin penetrator surrounded by a discarding sabot. Staballoys are metal alloys of depleted uranium with a very small proportion of other metals, usually titanium or molybdenum. One formulation has a composition of 99.25% by mass of depleted uranium and 0.75% by mass of titanium. Staballoys are approximately 1.67 times as dense as lead and are designed for use in kinetic energy penetrator armor-piercing ammunition. The US Army uses DU in an alloy with around 3.5% titanium.

Depleted uranium is favored for the penetrator because it is self-sharpening and flammable. On impact with a hard target, such as an armored vehicle, the nose of the rod fractures in such a way that it remains sharp. The impact and subsequent release of heat energy causes it to ignite. When a DU penetrator reaches the interior of an armored vehicle, it catches fire, often igniting ammunition and fuel, killing the crew and possibly causing the vehicle to explode. DU is used by the U.S. Army in 120 mm or 105 mm cannons employed on the M1 Abrams tank. The Soviet/Russian military has used DU ammunition in tank main gun ammunition since the late 1970s, mostly for the 115 mm guns in the T-62 tank and the 125 mm guns in the T-64, T-72, T-80, and T-90 tanks.

The DU content in various ammunition is 180 g in 20 mm projectiles, 200 g in 25 mm ones, 280 g in 30 mm, 3.5 kg in 105 mm, and 4.5 kg in 120 mm penetrators. DU was used during the mid-1990s in the U.S. to make hand grenades, and land mines, but those applications have been discontinued, according to Alliant Techsystems. The US Navy used DU in its 20 mm Phalanx CIWS guns, but switched in the late 1990s to armor-piercing tungsten.

Only the US and the UK have acknowledged using DU weapons. 782,414 DU rounds were fired during the 1991 war in Iraq, mostly by US forces. In a three-week period of conflict in Iraq during 2003, it was estimated that between 1,000 and 2,000 tonnes of depleted uranium munitions were used. More than 300,000 DU rounds were fired during the 2003 war, the vast majority by US troops.

Legal status in weapons
In 1996, the International Court of Justice (ICJ) gave an advisory opinion on the "legality of the threat or use of nuclear weapons". This made it clear, in paragraphs 54, 55 and 56, that international law on poisonous weapons—the Second Hague Declaration of 29 July 1899, Hague Convention IV of 18 October 1907 and the Geneva Protocol of 17 June 1925—did not cover nuclear weapons, because their prime or exclusive use was not to poison or asphyxiate. This ICJ opinion was about nuclear weapons, but the sentence "The terms have been understood, in the practice of States, in their ordinary sense as covering weapons whose prime, or even exclusive, effect is to poison or asphyxiate," also removes depleted uranium weaponry from coverage by the same treaties as their primary use is not to poison or asphyxiate, but to destroy materiel and kill soldiers through kinetic energy.

The Sub-Commission on Prevention of Discrimination and Protection of Minorities of the United Nations Human Rights Commission, passed two motions—the first in 1996 and the second in 1997. They listed weapons of mass destruction, or weapons with indiscriminate effect, or of a nature to cause superfluous injury or unnecessary suffering and urged all states to curb the production and the spread of such weapons. Included in the list was weaponry containing depleted uranium. The committee authorized a working paper, in the context of human rights and humanitarian norms, of the weapons.

The requested UN working paper was delivered in 2002 by Y. K. J. Yeung Sik Yuen in accordance with Sub-Commission on the Promotion and Protection of Human Rights resolution 2001/36. He argues that the use of DU in weapons, along with the other weapons listed by the Sub‑Commission, may breach one or more of the following treaties: the Universal Declaration of Human Rights, the Charter of the United Nations, the Genocide Convention, the United Nations Convention Against Torture, the Geneva Conventions including Protocol I, the Convention on Conventional Weapons of 1980, and the Chemical Weapons Convention. Yeung Sik Yuen writes in Paragraph 133 under the title "Legal compliance of weapons containing DU as a new weapon":

Louise Arbour, chief prosecutor for the International Criminal Tribunal for the Former Yugoslavia led a committee of staff lawyers to investigate possible treaty prohibitions against the use of DU in weapons. Their findings were that:

According to the United Nations Institute for Disarmament Research,  depleted uranium does not meet the legal definitions of nuclear, radiological, toxin, chemical, poison or incendiary weapons, as far as DU ammunition is not designed nor intended to kill or wound by its chemical or radiological effects.

Requests for a moratorium on military use
A number of anti-war activists specializing in international humanitarian law have questioned the legality of the continued use of depleted uranium weapons, highlighting that the effects may breach the principle of distinction (between civilians and military personnel). Some states and the International Coalition to Ban Uranium Weapons, a coalition of more than 155 non-governmental organizations, have asked for a ban on the production and military use of depleted uranium weapons.

The European Parliament has repeatedly passed resolutions requesting an immediate moratorium on the further use of depleted uranium ammunition, but France and Britain – the only European states that are permanent members of the United Nations Security Council—have consistently rejected calls for a ban, maintaining that its use continues to be legal, and that the health risks are unsubstantiated.

In 2007, France, Britain, the Netherlands, and the Czech Republic voted against a United Nations General Assembly resolution to hold a debate in 2009 about the effects of the use of armaments and ammunitions containing depleted uranium. All other European Union nations voted in favour or abstained. The ambassador from the Netherlands explained his negative vote as being due to the reference in the preamble to the resolution "to potential harmful effects of the use of depleted uranium munitions on human health and the environment [which] cannot, in our view, be supported by conclusive scientific studies conducted by relevant international organizations." None of the other permanent members of the United Nations Security Council supported the resolution as China was absent for the vote, Russia abstained and the United States voted against the resolution.

In September 2008, and in response to the 2007 General Assembly resolution, the UN Secretary General published the views of 15 states alongside those of the International Atomic Energy Agency (IAEA) and World Health Organization (WHO). The IAEA and WHO evidence differed little from previous statements on the issue. The report was largely split between states concerned about depleted uranium's use, such as Finland, Cuba, Japan, Serbia, Argentina, and predominantly NATO members, who do not consider the use of depleted uranium munitions problematic.

In December 2008, 141 states supported a resolution requesting that three UN agencies: United Nations Environment Programme (UNEP), WHO and IAEA update their research on the impact of uranium munitions by late 2010—to coincide with the General Assembly's 65th Session, four voted against, 34 abstained and 13 were absent As before Britain and France voted against the resolution. All other European Union nations voted in favour or abstained: the Netherlands, which voted against a resolution in 2007, voted in favour, as did Finland and Norway, both of which had abstained in 2007, while the Czech Republic, which voted against the resolution in 2007, abstained. The two other states that voted against the resolution were Israel and the United States (both of which voted against in 2007), while as before China was absent for the vote, and Russia abstained.

On 21 June 2009, Belgium became the first country in the world to ban: "inert ammunition and armour that contains depleted uranium or any other industrially manufactured uranium." The move followed a unanimous parliamentary vote on the issue on 22 March 2007. The text of the 2007 law allowed for two years to pass until it came into force. In April 2009, the Belgian Senate voted unanimously to restrict investments by Belgian banks into the manufacturers of depleted uranium weapons.

In September 2009, the Latin American Parliament passed a resolution calling for a regional moratorium on the use, production and procurement of uranium weapons. It also called on the Parlatino's members to work towards an international uranium weapons treaty.

In November 2010 the Irish Senate passed a bill seeking to outlaw depleted uranium weapons, but it lapsed before approval by the Dáil.

In December 2010, 148 states supported a United Nations' General Assembly resolution calling for the states that use depleted uranium weapons in conflict to reveal where the weapons have been fired when asked to do so by the country upon whose territory they have been used.

In April 2011, the Congress of Costa Rica passed a law prohibiting uranium weapons in its territories, becoming the second country in the world to do so.

In December 2012, 155 states supported a United Nations' General Assembly resolution that recalled that, because of the ongoing uncertainties over the long-term environmental impacts of depleted uranium identified by the United Nations Environment Programme, states should adopt a precautionary approach to its use.

In December 2014, 150 states supported a United Nations' General Assembly resolution encouraging states to provide assistance to states affected by the use of depleted uranium weapons, in particular in identifying and managing contaminated sites and material. In contrast to the previous biennial resolutions, Germany moved to an abstention from supporting to the resolutions. Prior to the vote, in a report to the United Nations Secretary General requested by 2012's resolution published in June 2014, Iraq had called for a global treaty ban on depleted uranium weapons.

Civilian applications
Depleted uranium has a very high density and is primarily used as shielding material for other radioactive material, and as ballast. Examples include sailboat keels, as counterweights and as shielding in industrial radiography cameras.

Radiation shielding
Depleted uranium is the best radiation shielding by weight, due to the high atomic weight of the uranium atoms; materials are more able to block radioactivity the higher their atomic weight, and uranium is the heaviest natural element. Lead, the heaviest stable element, is the most common low-cost alternative, but a lead shield needs to be about three times as thick as a DU shield to provide the equivalent protection. Uranium also has by far a higher melting point , and its tensile strength is similar to that of steel.

Industrial radiography cameras include a very high activity gamma radiation source (typically Ir-192 with an activity above 10 TBq). Depleted uranium is often used in the cameras as a shield to protect individuals from the gamma source. Typically, the uranium shield is supported and enclosed in polyurethane foam for thermal, mechanical and oxidation protection.

Coloring in consumer products
Consumer product uses have included incorporation into dental porcelain, used for false teeth to simulate the fluorescence of natural teeth, and uranium-bearing reagents used in chemistry laboratories (e.g. uranyl acetate, used in analytical chemistry and as a stain in electron microscopy). Uranium (both depleted uranium and natural uranium) was widely used as a coloring matter for porcelain and glass in the 19th and early-to-mid-20th century. The practice was largely discontinued in the late 20th century. In 1999, concentrations of 10% depleted uranium were being used in "jaune no.17" a yellow enamel powder that was being produced in France by Cristallerie de Saint-Paul, a manufacturer of enamel pigments. The depleted uranium used in the powder was sold by Cogéma's Pierrelatte facility. In February 2000, Cogema discontinued the sale of depleted uranium to producers of enamel and glass.

Trim weights in aircraft
This application is controversial because the DU might enter the environment if the aircraft crashes. The metal can also oxidize to a fine powder in a fire. Its use has been phased out in many newer aircraft. Boeing and McDonnell-Douglas discontinued using DU counterweights in the 1980s. DU counterweights manufactured with cadmium plating are considered non-hazardous as long as the plating is intact.

US NRC general license
US Nuclear Regulatory Commission regulations at 10 CFR 40.25 establish a general license for the use of depleted uranium contained in industrial products or devices for mass-volume applications. This general license allows anyone to possess or use depleted uranium for authorized purposes. Generally, a registration form is required, along with a commitment to not abandon the material. Agreement states may have similar, or more stringent, regulations.

Sailboat keel

The benefit is that, because of the very high density of uranium, the keel could be thinner for a given weight, and so have less resistance than a normal keel. It was later replaced by a standard lead keel.

Sampling calorimeters for detectors in high-energy particle physics
Depleted uranium has been used in a number of sampling calorimeters (such as in the D0 and ZEUS detectors) because of its high density and natural radioactivity.

Health considerations
Normal functioning of the kidney, brain, liver, heart, and numerous other systems can be affected by uranium exposure because uranium is a toxic metal, although less toxic than other heavy metals, such as arsenic and mercury. It is weakly radioactive but is 'persistently' so because of its long half-life. The Agency for Toxic Substances and Disease Registry states that: "to be exposed to radiation from uranium, you have to eat, drink, or breathe it, or get it on your skin." If DU particles do enter an individual, the type of danger presented—toxic vs. radiological—and the organ most likely to be affected depend on the solubility of the particles.

In military conflicts involving DU munitions, the major concern is inhalation of DU particles in aerosols arising from the impacts of DU-enhanced projectiles with their targets. When depleted uranium munitions penetrate armor or burn, they create depleted uranium oxides in the form of dust that can be inhaled or contaminate wounds. The Institute of Nuclear Technology-Radiation Protection of Attiki, Greece, has noted that "the aerosol produced during impact and combustion of depleted uranium munitions can potentially contaminate wide areas around the impact sites or can be inhaled by civilians and military personnel". The use of DU in incendiary ammunition is controversial because of potential adverse health effects and its release into the environment.

The U.S. Department of Defense claims that no human cancer of any type has been seen as a result of exposure to either natural or depleted uranium. Militaries have long had risk-reduction procedures for their troops to follow, and studies are in consistent agreement that veterans who used DU-enhanced munitions have not suffered, so far, from an increased risk of cancer (see the Gulf War and Balkans sections below). The effects of DU on civilian populations are, however, a topic of intense and ongoing controversy.

As early as 1997, British Army doctors warned the Ministry of Defence that exposure to depleted uranium increased the risk of developing lung, lymph and brain cancer, and recommended a series of safety precautions. According to a report issued summarizing the advice of the doctors, "Inhalation of insoluble uranium dioxide dust will lead to accumulation in the lungs with very slow clearance—if any. ... Although chemical toxicity is low, there may be localised radiation damage of the lung leading to cancer." The report warns that "All personnel ... should be aware that uranium dust inhalation carries a long-term risk ... [the dust] has been shown to increase the risks of developing lung, lymph and brain cancers." In 2003, the Royal Society called, again, for urgent attention to be paid to the possible health and environmental impact of depleted uranium, and added its backing to the United Nations Environment Programme's call for a scientific assessment of sites struck with depleted uranium. In early 2004, the UK Pensions Appeal Tribunal Service attributed birth defect claims from a February 1991 Gulf War combat veteran to depleted uranium poisoning. Also, a 2005 epidemiology review concluded: "In aggregate the human epidemiological evidence is consistent with increased risk of birth defects in offspring of persons exposed to DU." Studies using cultured cells and laboratory rodents continue to suggest the possibility of leukemogenic, genetic, reproductive, and neurological effects from chronic exposure.

Chemical toxicity
The chemical toxicity of depleted uranium is identical to that of natural uranium and about a million times greater in vivo than DU's radiological hazard, with the kidney considered to be the main target organ. Health effects of DU are determined by factors such as the extent of exposure and whether it was internal or external. Three main pathways exist by which internalization of uranium may occur: inhalation, ingestion, and embedded fragments or shrapnel contamination. Properties such as phase (e.g. particulate or gaseous), oxidation state (e.g. metallic or ceramic), and the solubility of uranium and its compounds influence their absorption, distribution, translocation, elimination and the resulting toxicity. For example, metallic uranium is less toxic compared to hexavalent uranium(VI) uranyl compounds such as uranium trioxide.

Uranium is pyrophoric when finely divided. It will corrode under the influence of air and water producing insoluble uranium(IV) and soluble uranium(VI) salts. Soluble uranium salts are toxic. Uranium slowly accumulates in several organs, such as the liver, spleen, and kidneys.

Epidemiological studies and toxicological tests on laboratory animals point to it as being immunotoxic, teratogenic, neurotoxic, with carcinogenic and leukemogenic potential. A 2005 report by epidemiologists concluded: "the human epidemiological evidence is consistent with increased risk of birth defects in offspring of persons exposed to DU."

Early studies of depleted uranium aerosol exposure assumed that uranium combustion product particles would quickly settle out of the air and thus could not affect populations more than a few kilometers from target areas, and that such particles, if inhaled, would remain undissolved in the lung for a great length of time and thus could be detected in urine. Violently burning uranium droplets produce a gaseous vapor comprising about half of the uranium in their original mass. Uranyl ion contamination in uranium oxides has been detected in the residue of DU munitions fires.

Approximately  of natural uranium, on average, exist in the human body as a result of normal intake of water, food and air. Most is in the skeleton. The biochemistry of depleted uranium is the same as natural uranium.

Radiological hazards

The primary radiation danger from pure depleted uranium is due to alpha particles, which do not travel far through air, and do not penetrate clothing. However, in a matter of a month or so, a sample of pure depleted uranium will generate small amounts of thorium-234 and protactinium-234, which emit the more penetrating beta particles at almost the same rate as the uranium emits alpha particles. This is because uranium-238 decays directly to thorium-234, which with a half-life of 24 days decays to protactinium-234, which in turn decays in a matter of hours to the long-lived uranium-234. A quasi-steady state is therefore reached within a few multiples of 24 days.

Available evidence suggests that the radiation risk is small relative to the chemical hazard.

Surveying the veteran-related evidence pertaining to the Gulf War, a 2001 editorial in the BMJ concluded that it was not possible to justify claims of radiation-induced lung cancer and leukaemia in veterans of that conflict. While agreeing with the editorial's conclusion, a reply noted that its finding in the negative was guaranteed, given that "global dose estimates or results of mathematical modelling are too inaccurate to be used as dose values for an individual veteran", and that, as of April 2001, no practical method of measuring the expected small doses that each individual veteran would receive had been suggested. The author of the reply, a radiation scientist, went on to suggest a method that had been used several times before, including after the 1986 Chernobyl accident. Despite the widespread use of DU in the Iraq War, at least a year after the conflict began, testing for UK troops was still only in the discussion phase.

The Royal Society Working Group on the Health Hazards of Depleted Uranium Munitions (RSDUWG) concluded in 2002 that there were "very low" health risks associated with the use of depleted uranium, though it also ventured that, "[i]n extreme conditions and under worst-case assumptions" lung and kidney damage could occur, and that in "worst-case scenarios high local levels of uranium could occur in food or water that could have adverse effects on the kidney". In 2003, the Royal Society issued another urgent call to investigate the actual health and environmental impact of depleted uranium. The same year, a cohort study of Gulf War veterans found no elevated risks of cancer generally, nor of any specific cancers in particular, though recommended follow up studies.

According to the World Health Organization, a radiation dose from DU would be about 60% of that from purified natural uranium with the same mass; the radiological dangers are lower because of its longer half-life and the removal of the more radioactive isotopes.

Gulf War syndrome and soldier complaints

Since 1991, the year the Gulf War ended, veterans and their families voiced concern about subsequent health problems. In 1999, an assessment of the first 1,000 veterans involved in the Ministry of Defence's Gulf War medical assessment programme found "no evidence" of a single illness, physical or mental, that would explain the pattern of symptoms observed in the group. Nevertheless, in 1999, MEDACT petitioned for the WHO to conduct an investigation into illnesses in veterans and Iraqi civilians. A major 2006 review of peer-reviewed literature by a US Institute of Medicine committee concluded that, "[b]ecause the symptoms vary greatly among individuals", they do not point to a syndrome unique to Gulf War veterans, though their report conceded that the lack of objective pre-deployment health data meant definitive conclusions were effectively impossible. Simon Wessely praised the IOM's review, and noted that, despite its central conclusion that no novel syndrome existed, its other findings made it "equally clear that service in the Gulf war did aversely affect health in some personnel". Aside from the lack of baseline data to guide analysis of the veterans' postwar health, because no detailed health screening was carried out when the veterans entered service, another major stumbling block with some studies, like the thousand-veteran one, is that the subjects are self-selected, rather than a random sample, making general conclusions impossible.

Increased rates of immune system disorders and other wide-ranging symptoms, including chronic pain, fatigue and memory loss, have been reported in over one quarter of combat veterans of the 1991 Gulf War. Combustion products from depleted uranium munitions are being considered as one of the potential causes by the Research Advisory Committee on Gulf War Veterans' Illnesses, as DU was used in 30 mm and 25 mm cannon rounds on a large scale for the first time in the Gulf War. Veterans of the conflicts in the Persian Gulf, Bosnia and Kosovo have been found to have up to 14 times the usual level of chromosome abnormalities in their genes. Serum-soluble genotoxic teratogens produce congenital disorders, and in white blood cells causes immune system damage.

A 2005 epidemiology review concluded: "In aggregate the human epidemiological evidence is consistent with increased risk of birth defects in offspring of persons exposed to DU." A 2001 study of 15,000 February 1991 U.S. Gulf War combat veterans and 15,000 control veterans found that the Gulf War veterans were 1.8 (fathers) to 2.8 (mothers) times as likely to have children with birth defects. After examination of children's medical records two years later, the birth defect rate increased by more than 20%:

In early 2004, the UK Pensions Appeal Tribunal Service attributed birth defect claims from a February 1991 Gulf War combat veteran to depleted uranium poisoning. Looking at the risk of children of UK Gulf War veterans suffering genetic diseases such as congenital malformations, commonly called "birth defects", one study found that the overall risk of any malformation was 50% higher in Gulf War veterans as compared to other veterans.

The U.S. Army has commissioned ongoing research into potential risks of depleted uranium and other projectile weapon materials like tungsten, which the U.S. Navy has used in place of DU since 1993. Studies by the U.S. Armed Forces Radiobiology Research Institute conclude that moderate exposures to either depleted uranium or uranium present a significant toxicological threat.

In 2003, Professor Brian Spratt FRS, chairman of the Royal Society's working group on depleted uranium, said: "The question of who carries out the initial monitoring and clean-up is a political rather than scientific question," and "the coalition needs to acknowledge that depleted uranium is a potential hazard and make in-roads into tackling it by being open about where and how much depleted uranium has been deployed."

A 2008 review of all relevant articles appearing in the peer-reviewed journals on MEDLINE through to the end of 2007, including multiple cohort studies of veterans, found no consistent evidence of excess risks of neoplasms that could have some link to DU, and that "[t]he overall incidence of cancers is not increased in the cohort studies of Gulf war and Balkans veterans".

Though a more comprehensive assessment is possible, a 2011 update on a cancer scare regarding Italian soldiers who had served in the Balkans found lower than expected incidence rates for all cancers, a finding "consistent with lacking evidence of an increased cancer incidence among troops of other countries deployed in the areas of Iraq, Bosnia, and Kosovo, where armour-penetrating depleted uranium shells have been used."

One particular subgroup of veterans that may be at higher risk comprises those who have internally retained fragments of DU from shrapnel wounds. A laboratory study on rats produced by the Armed Forces Radiobiology Research Institute showed that, after a study period of 6 months, rats treated with depleted uranium coming from implanted pellets, comparable to the average levels in the urine of Desert Storm veterans with retained DU fragments, had developed a significant tendency to lose weight with respect to the control group.

Substantial amounts of uranium were accumulating in their brains and central nervous systems, and showed a significant reduction of neuronal activity in the hippocampus in response to external stimuli. The conclusions of the study show that brain damage from chronic uranium intoxication is possible at lower doses than previously thought. Results from computer-based neurocognitive tests performed in 1997 showed an association between uranium in the urine and "problematic performance on automated tests assessing performance efficiency and accuracy."

A 18 February 2021 report titled "Resolving whether inhalation of depleted uranium contributed to Gulf War Illness using high-sensitivity mass spectrometry” by Randall R. Parrish and Robert W. Haley concluded that uranium from exploding munitions did not lead to Gulf War illness (GWI) in veterans deployed in the 1991 Persian Gulf War. The report was based on a study using high-precision multicollector mass spectrometry for the first time in such a study. Their report states their study found no differences in secretion of uranium isotopic ratios from those meeting the standard-case definitions of GWI and control veterans without GWI. The researchers say that the most likely remaining causes for GWI are widespread low-level exposure to sarin nerve gas released by the destruction of Iraqi chemical weapons storage facilities in January 1991. This was possibly compounded by the use of anti-nerve agent medications and the use of pesticides to prevent insect-borne diseases in coalition forces.

Iraqi population
Since 2001, medical personnel working for the Iraqi state health service controlled by Saddam Hussein at the Basra hospital in southern Iraq have reported a sharp increase in the incidence of child leukemia and genetic malformation among babies born in the decade following the Gulf War. Iraqi doctors attributed these malformations to possible long-term effects of DU, an opinion that was echoed by several newspapers. In 2004, Iraq had the highest mortality rate due to leukemia of any country. In 2003, the Royal Society called for Western militaries to disclose where and how much DU they had used in Iraq so that rigorous, and hopefully conclusive, studies could be undertaken out in affected areas. The International Coalition to Ban Uranium Weapons (ICBUW) likewise urged that an epidemiological study be made in the Basra region, as asked for by Iraqi doctors, but no peer-reviewed study has yet been undertaken in Basra.

A medical survey, "Cancer, Infant Mortality and Birth Sex Ratio in Fallujah, Iraq 2005–2009" published in July 2010, states that the "...increases in cancer and birth defects...are alarmingly high" and that infant mortality 2009/2010 has reached 13.6%. The group compares the dramatic increase, five years after wartime exposure in 2004, with the lymphoma that Italian peacekeepers developed after the Balkan wars and the increased cancer risk in certain parts of Sweden because of the Chernobyl fallout. The origin and time of introduction of the carcinogenic agent causing the genetic stress the group will address in a separate report. The report mentions depleted uranium as one "potentially relevant exposure" but makes no conclusions on the source.

Four studies investigating links between the use of depleted uranium by Coalition forces during the Second Battle of Fallujah were conducted in 2012, one of which described the people of Fallujah as having "the highest rate of genetic damage in any population ever studied." In response to these studies, Ross Caputi, a former U.S. Marine who participated in the battle, wrote a Guardian article calling for the United States government to conduct its own study into the matter.

The Balkans

In 2001, the World Health Organization reported that data from Kosovo was inconclusive and called for further studies. That same year, governments of several European countries, particularly Italy, reported an increase in illnesses and developments of cancers among veterans that served in Balkan peacekeeping missions.

A 2003 study by the United Nations Environment Programme (UNEP) in Bosnia and Herzegovina stated that low levels of contaminant were found in drinking water and air particulate at DU penetrator impact points. The levels were stated as not a cause for alarm. Yet, Pekka Haavisto, chairman of the UNEP DU projects stated, "The findings of this study stress again the importance of appropriate clean-up and civil protection measures in a post-conflict situation."

A team of Italian scientists from the University of Siena reported in 2005 that, although DU was "clearly" added to the soil in the study area, "the phenomenon was very limited spatially and the total uranium concentrations fell within the natural range of the element in soils. Moreover, the absolute uranium concentrations indicate that there was no contamination of the earthworm species studied."

In 2018, Serbia set up a commission of inquiry into the consequences of the use of depleted uranium during the 1999 NATO bombing of Yugoslavia in southern Serbia and its link to the rise of diseases and tumors among citizens, particularly in young children born after 1999. Zoran Radovanovic, an epidemiologist and the chairman of the Serbian Medical Association's ethics committee, denied that there had been a rise in cancer cases in areas where bombings had taken place. He continued by saying that Serbians frequently worry about a cancer epidemic that does not exist. NATO has repeatedly claimed that depleted uranium found in the ammunition used in the 1999 bombardments cannot be linked to adverse health effects.

Okinawa, Japan 
Between 1995 and 1996, U.S. Marine AV-8B Harrier jets accidentally fired more than 1500 DU rounds at the Tori Shima gunnery range but the military did not notify the Japanese government until January 1997.

Sardinia, Italy
Depleted uranium has been named as a possible contributing factor to a high incidence of birth defects and cancer near the Salto di Quirra weapons testing range on the Italian island of Sardinia.

Contamination as a result of the Afghan War

Remscheid, Germany 

On 8 December 1988, an A-10 Thunderbolt II attack jet of the United States Air Force crashed onto a residential area in the city of Remscheid, West Germany. The aircraft crashed into the upper floor of an apartment complex. In addition to the pilot, five people were killed. Fifty others were injured, many of them seriously. When the number of cancer cases in the vicinity of the accident rose disproportionately in the years after, suspicion rose that the depleted uranium ballast in the jet may have been the cause. This was denied by the US military. However, 70 tons of top soil from the accident scene was removed and taken away to a depot. Also, film material taken during the top-soil removal show radiation warning signs. 120 residents and rescue workers reported skin diseases. Medical diagnosis concluded that these symptoms related to toxic irritative dermatitis.

Studies indicating negligible effects
Studies in 2005 and earlier have concluded that DU ammunition has no measurable detrimental health effects.

A 1999 literature review conducted by the Rand Corporation stated: "No evidence is documented in the literature of cancer or any other negative health effect related to the radiation received from exposure to depleted or natural uranium, whether inhaled or ingested, even at very high doses," and a RAND report authored by the U.S. Defense department undersecretary charged with evaluating DU hazards considered the debate to be more political than scientific.

A 2001 oncology study concluded that "the present scientific consensus is that DU exposure to humans, in locations where DU ammunition was deployed, is very unlikely to give rise to cancer induction". Former NATO Secretary General Lord Robertson stated in 2001 that "the existing medical consensus is clear. The hazard from depleted uranium is both very limited, and limited to very specific circumstances".

A 2002 study from the Australian defense ministry concluded that "there has been no established increase in mortality or morbidity in workers exposed to uranium in uranium processing industries... studies of Gulf War veterans show that, in those who have retained fragments of depleted uranium following combat related injury, it has been possible to detect elevated urinary uranium levels, but no kidney toxicity or other adverse health effects related to depleted uranium after a decade of follow-up." Pier Roberto Danesi, then-director of the International Atomic Energy Agency (IAEA) Seibersdorf +Laboratory, stated in 2002 that "There is a consensus now that DU does not represent a health threat".

The IAEA reported in 2003 that, "based on credible scientific evidence, there is no proven link between DU exposure and increases in human cancers or other significant health or environmental impacts," although "Like other heavy metals, DU is potentially poisonous. In sufficient amounts, if DU is ingested or inhaled it can be harmful because of its chemical toxicity. High concentration could cause kidney damage." The IAEA concluded that, while depleted uranium is a potential carcinogen, there is no evidence that it has been carcinogenic in humans.

A 2005 study by Sandia National Laboratories' Al Marshall used mathematical models to analyze potential health effects associated with accidental exposure to depleted uranium during the 1991 Gulf War. Marshall's study concluded that the reports of cancer risks from DU exposure are not supported by his analysis nor by veteran medical statistics. Marshall also examined possible genetic effects due to radiation from depleted uranium. Chemical effects, including potential reproductive issues, associated with depleted uranium exposure were discussed in some detail in a subsequent journal paper.

Atmospheric contamination as a result of military actions
Elevated radiation levels consistent with very low level atmospheric depleted uranium contamination have been found in air samples taken by the UK Atomic Weapons Establishment at several monitoring sites in Britain. These elevated readings appear to coincide with Operation Anaconda in Afghanistan, and the Shock and Awe bombing campaign at the start of the Second Gulf War.

Other contamination cases
On 4 October 1992, an El Al Boeing 747-F cargo aircraft (Flight 1862) crashed into an apartment building in Amsterdam. Local residents and rescue workers complained of various unexplained health issues, which were being attributed to the release of hazardous materials during the crash and subsequent fires. Authorities conducted an epidemiological study in 2000 of those believed to be affected by the accident. The study concluded that there was no evidence to link depleted uranium (used as counterbalance weights on the elevators of the plane) to any of the reported health complaints.

Safety and environmental issues 

About 95% of the depleted uranium produced until now is stored as uranium hexafluoride, (D)UF6, in steel cylinders in open air yards close to enrichment plants. Each cylinder contains up to 12.7 tonnes (or 14 US tons) of UF6. In the U.S. alone, 560,000 tonnes of depleted UF6 had accumulated by 1993. In 2005, 686,500 tonnes in 57,122 storage cylinders were located near Portsmouth, Ohio, Oak Ridge, Tennessee, and Paducah, Kentucky.
The long-term storage of DUF6 presents environmental, health, and safety risks because of its chemical instability. When UF6 is exposed to moist air, it reacts with the water in the air and produces UO2F2 (uranyl fluoride) and HF (hydrogen fluoride), both of which are highly soluble and toxic. Storage cylinders must be regularly inspected for signs of corrosion and leaks. The estimated lifetime of the steel cylinders is measured in decades.

There have been several accidents involving uranium hexafluoride in the United States.
The vulnerability of DUF6 storage cylinders to terrorist attack is apparently not the subject of public reports. However, the U.S. government has been converting DUF6 to solid uranium oxides for disposal.
Disposing of the whole DUF6 inventory could cost anywhere from 15 to 450 million dollars.

See also
 CANDU reactor, commercial power reactors that can use unenriched uranium fuel
 Environmental impact of war
 Traveling wave reactor - a reactor that uses depleted uranium for fuel

References

Notes

Bibliography

External links

Scientific bodies
 US Health Physics Society

United Nations
 "Human rights and weapons of mass destruction, or with indiscriminate effect, or of a nature to cause superfluous injury or unnecessary suffering" (The UN 2002 report)
 Depleted Uranium and the IAEA

Scientific reports
 ATSDR – Case Studies in Environmental Medicine (CSEM): Uranium Toxicity U.S. Department of Health and Human Services
 "Depleted Uranium in Bosnia and Herzegovina – Postconflict Assessment"  by UN Environment Programme
 "Radiological Conditions in Areas of Kuwait With Residues of Depleted Uranium" by International Atomic Energy Agency
 "Technical Report on Capacity-building for the Assessment of Depleted Uranium in Iraq"  by UN Environment Programme
 "A Review of the Scientific Literature As It Pertains to Gulf War Illnesses" by RAND
 Depleted Uranium article from the Royal Society (archived)
 An Analysis of Uranium Dispersal and Health Effects Using a Gulf War Case Study by Sandia National Laboratories
 Depleted Uranium Human Health Fact Sheet by Argonne National Laboratory Environmental Assessment Division
 Depleted uranium (DU) normative value pilot study: levels of uranium in urine samples from the general population  by AD Jones, BG Miller S Walker, J Anderson, AP Colvin, PA Hutchison, CA Soutar. IOM Research Report TM/05/03
 A normative study of levels of uranium in the urine of personnel in the British Forces  by BG Miller, AP Colvin, PA Hutchison, H Tait, S Dempsey, D Lewis, CA Soutar. IOM Research Report TM/05/08
 Opinion on the environmental and health risks posed by depleted uranium by the Scientific Committee on Health and Environmental Risks (SCHER)

 
Aftermath of war
Element toxicology
Environmental impact of war
Medical controversies
Uranium, Depleted
Suspected teratogens
Uranium
Vehicle armour
Ammunition